Pokhara Premier League is a franchise Twenty20 cricket tournament held in Nepal. The tournament is managed by Queen's Event Management.

The league is an auction-based tournament where players will be sold based on different price ceilings.

Lead by the board member of Cricket Association of Nepal (CAN), Chhumbi Lama, the idea of organizing it in Pokhara is mainly to create a benchmark for domestic cricket, initiate sports tourism mechanism within the region and establish it as one of the cricketing hubs within the country. All matches are shown be live on Himalayan TV HD. This is the third largest national level league played in Nepal.  Before this, Everest Premier League and Dhangadhi Premier League were two national level hitting leagues.

Teams

Current

Former

Results

See also 

 Dhangadhi Premier League
 Everest Premier League

References

External links
 Official Website
 Pokhara Premier League - 2018 at Cricinfo

 
Cricket in Nepal
2018 establishments in Nepal